Andrew Roger Henderson (born 3 February 1980) is a Scottish rugby union footballer who played at centre; who was capped 53 times and scored eight tries for Scotland.

Early life
Henderson was born on 3 February 1980 in Chatham in Kent, England. He was educated at Lenzie primary school and Lenzie Academy.

Rugby career
Henderson played rugby union for West of Scotland at stand off as a youngster before moving to Glasgow Hawks, then Glasgow Warriors where he was preferred at centre.

Playing as a centre, apart from one outing on the wing (versus Wales 2004), he made his debut in the blue of Scotland in 2001 as a second-half replacement against Ireland. The Scots won 32–10 with Henderson scoring the fourth try. His final game for Scotland was in 2008.

In March 2009, Henderson joined Montauban in France on a three-year contract. Due to financial difficulties and relegation from the Top 14 at Montauban, he was released at the end of 2010 season. He returned to Glasgow in the summer of 2011 to play with Glasgow Hutchesons Aloysians, where as Club Captain he appeared 102 times over five seasons.

He is often called "Muffles" because of his hair used to cover his ears.

He presented the match ball on 2 January 2016 for the Glasgow Warriors re-located second leg of the 1872 Cup match against Edinburgh at Murrayfield Stadium.

References

External links
profile at www.glasgowwarriors.com (unofficial fansite)

1980 births
Living people
Anglo-Scots
Glasgow Hutchesons Aloysians RFC players
Glasgow Warriors players
People educated at Lenzie Academy
Rugby union centres
Rugby union players from Chatham, Kent
Scotland international rugby union players
Scottish rugby union players
West of Scotland FC players